is the sequel to Super Professional Baseball.

Summary
Although Super Professional Baseball was the basis for the North American port called Super Bases Loaded, Super Professional Baseball II is a significantly different game than Super Bases Loaded 2. The end result of either winning a single game or winning the championship is fireworks followed by a ticker-tape parade.

References

1992 video games
Jaleco games
Nippon Professional Baseball video games
Super Nintendo Entertainment System games
Super Nintendo Entertainment System-only games
Tose (company) games
Video game sequels
Video games developed in Japan
Multiplayer and single-player video games